Pipeline video inspection is a form of telepresence used to visually inspect the interiors of pipelines, plumbing systems, and storm drains. A common application is for a plumber to determine the condition of small diameter sewer lines and household connection drain pipes.

Older sewer lines of small diameter, typically , are made by the union of a number of short  sections. Each iron or clay segment will have an enlargement (a "bell") on one end to receive the end of the adjacent segment. Roots from trees and vegetation may work into the joins between segments and can be forceful enough to break open a larger opening in terra cotta or corroded cast iron. Eventually a root ball will form that will impede the flow and this may cleaned out by a cutter mechanism or plumber's snake and subsequently inhibited by use of a chemical foam - a rooticide.

With modern video equipment, the interior of the pipe may be inspected - this is a form of non-destructive testing. A small diameter collector pipe will typically have a cleanout access at the far end and will be several hundred feet long, terminating at a manhole. Additional collector pipes may discharge at this manhole and a pipe (perhaps of larger diameter) will carry the effluent to the next manhole, and so forth to a pump station or treatment plant.

Without regular inspection of public sewers, a significant amount of waste may accumulate unnoticed until the system fails. In order to prevent resulting catastrophic events such as pipe bursts and raw sewage flooding onto city streets, municipalities usually conduct pipeline video inspections as a precautionary measure.

Inspection equipment

Service truck
The service truck contains a power supply in the form of a small generator, a small air-conditioned compartment containing video monitoring and recording equipment, and related computer and display for feature recording.

Cable and winch
At the back end of the truck is a powered reel with video cable reinforced with kevlar or steel wire braid.  Some trucks also contain a powered winch that booms out from the truck allowing for lowering and retrieval of the inspection equipment from the pipeline.

Inspection camera
Sometimes referred to as a PIG (pipeline inspection gauge), the camera and lights are mounted in a swiveling head attached to a cylindrical body. The camera head can pan and tilt remotely. Integrated into the camera head are lighting devices, typically LEDs, for illuminating the pipeline.  The camera is connected to display equipment via a long cable wound upon a winch. Some companies, such as Rausch Electronics USA, incorporate a series of lasers in the camera to accurately measure the pipe diameter and other data.

Inspection process

Using a camera tractor

A run to be inspected will either start from an access pipe leading at an angle down to the sewer and then run downstream to a manhole, or will run between manholes.
The service truck is parked above the access point of the pipe.  The camera tractor, with a flexible cable attached to the rear, is then lowered into the pipeline.  The tractor is moved forward so that it is barely inside of the pipeline.  A "down-hole roller" is set up between the camera tractor and the cable reel in the service truck, preventing cable damage from rubbing the top of the pipeline.  The operator then retires to the inside of the truck and begins the inspection, remotely operating the camera tractor from the truck.  When the inspection is complete or the camera cable is fully extended, the camera tractor is put in reverse gear and the cable is wound up simultaneously.  When the camera tractor is near the original access point, the downhole roller is pulled up and the camera tractor is moved into the access point and pulled up to the service truck. A tractor may be used to inspect a complete blockage or collapse that would prevent using a fish and rope as described below.

Pulling the camera backwards

For small diameter pipes there may not be enough room for the tractor mechanism. Instead, a somewhat rigid "fish" is pushed through the pipe and attached to a rope at the access point near the truck. The fish is then pulled to place the rope along the pipe. The rope is then used to pull the inspection pig and cable through the pipe. Detaching the rope, the cable is then used to pull the pig backwards as the pipe is inspected on the monitor (this is the method shown in the illustrations below).

Analysis of video footage

Much of the analysis of what was viewed in the pipeline is conducted at the time of the inspection by the camera operator, but the entire inspection is always recorded and saved for review. Commercial software and hardware for video pipe inspection are available from a variety of vendors, including Cues, ITpipes, and WinCan.

Conduit rehabilitation
Depending mostly upon the change in conditions from a previous inspection various improvements may be made to the pipe. It may be cleaned with a rotating root cutting blade on the end of a segmented rotating chain, or a chemical foam may be applied to discourage root growth. If damage is found limited to only a few locations these may be excavated and repaired. Extensive moderate defects may be repaired by lining with a fabric liner that is pulled through the pipe, inflated, and then made rigid through chemical means. Severe damage may require excavation and replacement of the conduit.

References

Robotics
Piping
Plumbing
Telepresence